The year 1979 in science and technology involved some significant events, listed below.

Astronomy and space exploration
 February 7 – Pluto enters a 20-year period inside the orbit of Neptune for the first time in 230 years.
 March 7 – The largest magnetar (soft gamma repeater) event is recorded.
 July 11 – America's first space station, Skylab, is deliberately allowed to burn up on atmospheric entry over the Indian Ocean due to its decaying orbit and the lack of time to build a new spaceship to boost it up.
 September 1 – The American Pioneer 11 becomes the first spacecraft to visit Saturn when it passes the planet at a distance of 21,000 km.
 December 24 – The maiden launch of Ariane 1, the first rocket in the Ariane launcher family.
 Amateur Achievement Award of the Astronomical Society of the Pacific given for the first time.

Biology
 Arthur William Baden Powell publishes New Zealand Mollusca.

Computer science
 May 8 - Radio Shack releases TRSDOS 2.3
 VisiCalc becomes the first spreadsheet program.
 The US Federal Government releases the initial, draft version of Ada (programming language), a strongly typed, comb-structured language with exception handlers, for embedded systems.

Conservation
 April 5 – First stage of Kakadu National Park declared in Australia.

Earth sciences
 The RISE project first discovers hydrothermal vents known as 'black smokers', on a mid-ocean ridge in the Pacific Ocean.

History of science
 Robert Gwyn Macfarlane publishes Howard Florey: The Making of a Great Scientist.

Mathematics
 'Monstrous moonshine': John Conway and Simon P. Norton prove there is a connection between the Monster group M and the j-function in number theory.
 The first modern Sudoku, known as Number Place, appears in Dell Pencil Puzzles and Word Games (United States), devised by Howard Garns.

Medicine
 August – The eating disorder Bulimia nervosa is first described and named by British psychiatrist Gerald Russell.
 December 9 – The World Health Organization certifies the global eradication of smallpox.
 The last naturally occurring cases of polio are reported in the United States.
 Tumor protein p53 is identified by Lionel Crawford, David Lane, Arnold J. Levine and Lloyd J. Old.

Paleontology
 Dinosaur eggs found in the Two Medicine Formation of Montana.

Technology
 March 1 – Philips publicly demonstrate a prototype of an optical digital audio disc at a press conference in Eindhoven, Netherlands.
 June 12 – Human-powered aircraft Gossamer Albatross, built by an American team led by Paul MacCready and piloted by Bryan Allen, makes a successful crossing of the English Channel to win the second Kremer prize.
 First sale of Post-It Notes in Boise, Idaho.

Awards
 Nobel Prizes
 Physics – Sheldon Glashow, Abdus Salam, Steven Weinberg
 Chemistry – Herbert C. Brown, Georg Wittig
 Medicine – Allan M. Cormack, Godfrey N. Hounsfield
 Turing Award – Kenneth E. Iverson

Births
 June 29 – Artur Avila, Brazilian-born mathematician.

Deaths
 January – Oscar H. Banker (b. 1895), Armenian American inventor.
 March 11 – Noël Poynter (b. 1908), English medical historian.
 March 17 – Henry Aaron Hill (b. 1915), American fluorocarbon chemist, first African American president of the American Chemical Society.
 April 5 – Eugène Gabritschevsky (b. 1893), Russian biologist and artist.
 May 6 – Karl Wilhelm Reinmuth (b. 1892), German astronomer.
 June 1 – Werner Forssmann (b. 1904), German physician, recipient of the Nobel Prize in Physiology or Medicine.
 September 26 – Sir Barnes Wallis (b. 1887), English aeronautical engineer.
 October 10 – Guido Fanconi (b. 1892), Swiss pediatrician.
 October 12 – Katharine Burr Blodgett (b. 1898), American physicist and chemist.
 December 7 – Cecilia Payne-Gaposchkin (b. 1900), English-born American astronomer and astrophysicist.

References

 
20th century in science
1970s in science